Fahneh may refer to places in Iran:
 Fahneh, Firuzeh
 Fahneh, Nishapur